Janów Sokólski (Yiddish: Janowa, Janov) was a stetl in Gmina Sokółka, Sokółka County, Poland, destroyed during German invasion of Poland. Currently only a Jewish cemetery exists. The cemetery and the surrounding agricultural land are the property of gmina
The earliest known Jewish community in Janova is dated by 1720. The town was known for its wooden synagogue. (mid-1700s-1941)

References

External links
"We Remember Janow Sokolski"

Former populated places in Poland
Historic Jewish communities in Poland
Jewish communities destroyed in the Holocaust